Rivarennes may refer to the following places in France:

Rivarennes, Indre, a commune in the Indre department 
Rivarennes, Indre-et-Loire, a commune in the Indre-et-Loire department